Leigh Alexander (born ) is an American author, journalist, and video game writer. She is the former Editor-at-Large and News Editor for Gamasutra, and former editor-in-chief for the revived Boing Boing website Offworld. She has writing credits on the games Reigns: Her Majesty and Reigns: Game of Thrones.

Career
Her writing has appeared in Variety, the Los Angeles Times, Kotaku, Polygon, Vice, Edge, The Guardian, The Atlantic and Time. She also produces a video series called "Lo-Fi Let's Play", in which she plays and comments on adventure games from the 1980s.

Alexander has written two books about video games: Breathing Machine, about growing up with gaming and the nascent Internet, and Clipping Through, about life in the games industry as viewed through the lens of the Game Developers Conference (GDC). On February 14, 2015 Alexander released an illustrated short story, Mona. The book features illustrations by Emily Carroll. Alexander also recorded an audiobook version of Mona herself. Alexander cites the video game Silent Hill 2 as an inspiration. In February  2016, Leigh announced that she would be leaving Offworld and pursuing things outside of gaming.

Gamergate controversy

Alexander was one of several women who was harassed in connection with the #GamerGate hashtag. On August 28, 2014, Alexander published an article on Gamasutra titled "Gamers' don't have to be your audience. 'Gamers' are over". The article became a focal point within the Gamergate controversy, with users of #Gamergate successfully campaigning Intel to pull all of their ads from Gamasutra. Alexander criticized Intel's decision, saying "Intel was fleeced by a hate mob." Intel issued an apology and said that it did not intend to be "taking sides in an increasingly bitter debate in the gaming community." Intel later resumed advertising on Gamasutra in mid-November.

In an interview with MSNBC Digital that aired on October 21, 2014, Leigh Alexander spoke out against the Gamergate movement and talked about the harassment of game developer Zoë Quinn. Alexander stated that her criticism of Gamergate stemmed from what she believes to be "the terroristic dominance of traditional appetites in what should be a diverse and creative field."

During GDC 2015, Alexander hosted the #1ReasonToBe panel, aimed at better serving women and minorities within the video games industry. Alexander advocated for creating spaces for minorities and marginalized groups within gaming culture. Referencing both the panel and her website Offworld, Alexander said that "[it] doesn’t have to be a huge upheaval. Simply create space for our experiences in our work and lives and listen to us." The panel was well received by members of the games press like Polygon's Danielle Riendeau. The panel drew an audience that filled one of the largest venues in the GDC.

Selected works
 Breathing Machine: A Memoir of Computers (January 2014, Thought Catalog)
 Clipping Through: One Mad Week in Video Games (August 2014, Gumroad)
 Mona (February 2015, Gumroad)
 The State of Play: Creators and Critics on Video Game Culture (October 2015, Seven Stories Press)

References

External links

 

1981 births
Living people
21st-century American non-fiction writers
21st-century American women writers
American bloggers
American women bloggers
American technology journalists
American women journalists
American media critics
Video game critics
Women video game critics
American expatriates in England
Writers from Massachusetts